Alexander Metzger (born 22 February 1973) is a German bobsledder who has competed since 1998. He won the gold medal in the four-man event at the 2001 FIBT World Championships in St. Moritz.

Metzger also finished fifth in the four-man event at the 2006 Winter Olympics in Turin

References
 Bobsleigh four-man world championship medalists since 1930
 FIBT profile
 

1973 births
Bobsledders at the 2006 Winter Olympics
German male bobsledders
Living people
Olympic bobsledders of Germany